Šemovci   is a village in Croatia. It is connected by the D43 highway.

External links
 www.semovci.eu - Šemovci Portal Unofficial

Populated places in Koprivnica-Križevci County